Rangthylliang 1 root bridge is a living root bridge in Cherrapunji region,  Meghalaya, India. It is considered to be the longest living root bridge, at over 50 m in length. The bridge, named after the village of Rangthylliang, where various other root bridges can also be found, is situated 30 m above the ground. The trek for visiting the living root bridges starts in Rangthylliang and ends in Mawkyrnot village.

References

Bridges in India
Tourist attractions in Meghalaya